Rabbi Isaac Mayer Wise (29 March 1819, Lomnička – 26 March 1900, Cincinnati) was an American Reform rabbi, editor, and author. At his death he was called "the foremost rabbi in America".

Early life

Wise was born on 29 March 1819 in Steingrub in Bohemia (today Lomnička, a part of Plesná in the Czech Republic). The son of Leo Weis, a schoolteacher, he received his early Hebrew education from his father and grandfather, later continuing his Hebrew and secular studies in Prague.

He may have received the hattarat hora'ah from the Prague bet din, composed of Rabbis Rapoport, Samuel Freund, and E. L. Teweles, or from Rabbi Falk Kohn, however there is debate as to whether he was an ordained rabbi at all. It was even a source of controversy with his intellectual rival, Rabbi David Einhorn.

In 1843 he was appointed rabbi at Radneitz (now Radnice near Plzeň), where he remained for about two years. In 1846 Weis emigrated to the United States, arriving on July 23. He changed the spelling of his surname to Wise.

Reforms in Albany
In October, 1846, Wise was appointed rabbi of the Congregation Beth-El of Albany, New York. His eight years in that position has been described as "crucial period of his existence" and his "storm and stress period". During this time, he conceived many of his later projects. Soon after his appointment, Wise began with reforms. His congregation was the first American synagogue to: 
 Count women in forming a minyan (religious quorum).
 Allow men and women to sit together, in family pews. (Another source says this first happened in 1851, at Anshe Emeth.)
 Eliminate Bar Mitzvah, which in Wise's view was meaningless because at that age a boy cannot understand Judaism, and replace it with a later and more informed confirmation, open to girls as well.
 Have a mixed-sex choir.

In addition, Wise had famously remarked in reply to a question, when he was in Charleston, South Carolina applying for another Rabbinate position (at Kahal Kadosh Beth Elohim) and lecturing on "The Poetry of the Hebrew Bible", that he did not believe in the coming of the Messiah or the resurrection of the dead; a letter from the Charleston congregation documenting these statements was published in a newspaper. As a result, the trustees of the synagogue dismissed him in 1850, which Wise did not accept. At the following day's service, the first day of Rosh Hashanah, at the moment when the Torah scroll was being removed from the ark, an altercation broke out between opponents and defenders of Wise. The fracas was so pronounced that the Sheriff was called; the Sheriff cleared the synagogue, locked the doors, and took the keys. This was the end of Wise's position at Temple Beth-El.

Supporters of Wise formed a new congregation, Anshe Emeth. Wise remained with this congregation until 1854. In January 1852, Wise was Chaplain of the Legislature of the State of New York, a position supporters, including then-New York Senator William H. Seward, helped him get since Anshe Emeth was unable to pay a full salary. During this time Wise worked on his History of the Israelitish Nation, which he stated was based on "such facts as are able to stand the test of criticism", eliminating miracles, dogmas, and doctrines, and as a general principle distinguishing religion from history. Unable to find a publisher, he printed it at his own expense, with help from friends. As he put it, "it fell into the orthodox camps like a veritable bomb".

Minhag America prayer-book
In 1847, at the suggestion of Max Lilienthal, who was at that time stationed in New York, a bet din was formed, which was to act in the capacity of an advisory committee to the congregations of the country, without, however, exercising hierarchic powers. As members of this bet din, Lilienthal named Wise and two others, besides himself. At a meeting held in the spring of 1847 Wise submitted to the bet din the manuscript of a prayer-book, to be titled the Minhag America, and to be used by all the congregations of the country. No action was taken, however, until the Cleveland Conference of 1855, when a committee consisting of Wise, Rothenberg, and Isidor Kalisch was appointed to edit such a prayer-book. This book appeared under the title Minhag America, and was practically Wise's work; it was adopted by most of the congregations of the Western and Southern states. So pronounced was Wise's desire for union, that when in 1894 the Union Prayer Book was published by the Central Conference of American Rabbis, he voluntarily retired the Minhag America from his own congregation.

As early as 1848 Wise issued a call to the "ministers and other Israelites" of the United States, urging them to form a union which might put an end to the Jewish anarchy in the United States. His call appeared in the columns of The Occident, and was ably seconded by its editor, Isaac Leeser. Wise suggested that a meeting be held in the spring of 1849 at Philadelphia, to establish a union of the congregations of the entire country. This meeting did not take place, but the originator of the idea never ceased advocating it, especially after he had established his own newspaper, The Israelite, in 1854 (renamed The American Israelite in 1874). In its columns he tirelessly expounded his views upon the subject. His persistence won its reward when in 1873, twenty-five years after he had first broached the idea, the Union of American Hebrew Congregations was organized at Cincinnati.

Move to Cincinnati
In 1853 Wise was offered a position as rabbi  of the Bene Yeshurun congregation of the Lodge Street Synagogue of Cincinnati, Ohio. He accepted on condition that it be a lifetime appointment, which the congregation agreed to. He offered to release the congregation when his controversial History of the Israelitish Nation appeared months later, but the synagogue maintained its support for him. He moved to Cincinnati in April 1854, and was rabbi of that congregation for the remaining 46 years of his life.

Shortly after his move, he began the weekly newspaper The Israelite (after 1874 The American Israelite), and a German-language supplement for women, Die Deborah. Wise was above all an organizer, and called numerous institutions into being. He organized the building of the Plum Street Temple in 1866. The temple, noted for its architectural grandeur, was renamed the Isaac M. Wise Temple in his honor.

Hebrew Union College
Earnest as he was in proclaiming the necessity for union among the congregations, he was equally indefatigable in insisting upon the pressing need of a theological seminary for the training of rabbis for American pulpits. In his Reminiscences he gives a vivid picture of the incompetency of many of the men who posed as spiritual guides of congregations, during his early days in the United States. He had scarcely arrived in Cincinnati when, with his characteristic energy, he set to work to establish a college in which young men could receive a Jewish education. He enlisted the interest and support of a number of influential Jews of Cincinnati and adjacent towns, and in 1855 founded the Zion Collegiate Association. The venture, however, proved a failure, and the society did not succeed in opening a college. Not daunted, Wise entered upon a literary campaign, and year in and year out he presented the subject in the columns of The Israelite. Starting in 1868 the project benefited from the administrave skills of Jacob Ezekiel. His indomitable perseverance was crowned with success when, on 3 October 1875, the Hebrew Union College opened its doors for the reception of students, four of whom were ordained eight years later. In a famous incident, the 1883 "Trefa Banquet" for this first graduating class included a number of non-kosher foods; Wise was probably not responsible for it, but he refused to condemn it, and criticism from him and his movement of what he called "kitchen Judaism" spurred the splitting-off of Conservative Judaism from Reform.

Rabbinical conferences
The first outcome of Wise's agitation for union among the Jews was the Cleveland Conference held in 1855, and convened at his initiative. This conference was unfortunate, for, instead of uniting the rabbis of all parts of the country in a bond of fellowship, it gave rise to strained relations between Wise and his followers on one side, and prominent rabbis in the eastern part of the country on the other side. These differences were partly removed during the rabbinical conference of Philadelphia (1869), which Wise attended. The New York conference of 1870, and the Cincinnati conference of 1871 were efforts in the same direction; but a controversy ensuing from the latter served only to widen the breach. Yet was the great "unionist" not discouraged. He continued agitating for a synod which was to be the central body of authority for American Judaism. In 1881 he submitted to the meeting of the Rabbinical Literary Association a report urging the formation of a synod; but the matter never passed beyond the stage of discussion. However, he lived to see the establishment of the Central Conference of American Rabbis in 1889, which was the third enduring offspring of his tireless energy and unfailing perseverance. During the last eleven years of his life he served as president of the conference which he had called into existence.

Besides the arduous labors that the organization of these national institutions entailed, Wise was active in many other ways. In 1857, when a new treaty was to be concluded between the United States and Switzerland, he visited Washington as chairman of a delegation to protest against the ratification of this treaty unless Switzerland should cease its discrimination against American Jews. In his own city, besides officiating as rabbi of the Bene Yeshurun congregation and as president of the Hebrew Union College, he edited the American Israelite and the Deborah, served as an examiner of teachers applying for positions in public schools, and was also a member of the board of directors of the University of Cincinnati. He traveled throughout the United States, lecturing, dedicating synagogues, and enlisting the interest of the Jewish communities in his plans and projects.

Jewish-Christian relations
As part of a program to defend Judaism against the inroads of Christianity, while refusing to demonize it, Isaac Mayer Wise offered innovative and influential views of the founding figures of Christianity. He was among the earliest Jewish scholars to reclaim Jesus as a Jew, and, more controversially, to suggest that Paul was in fact the Talmudic figure Acher.

Slavery
Isaac Mayer Wise has been criticized for his attitude toward slavery. In an article from 1864, Isaac Mayer Wise wrote: "We are not prepared, nobody is, to maintain it is absolutely unjust to purchase savages, or rather, their labor, place them under the protection of law, and secure them the benefit of civilized society and their sustenance for their labor. Man in a savage state is not free; the alien servant under the Mosaic law was a free man, excepting only the fruits of his labor. The abstract idea of liberty is more applicable to the alien labor of the Mosaic system than to the savage, and savages only will sell themselves or their offspring. Negro slavery, if it could have been brought under the control of the Mosaic or similar laws, must have tended to the blessing of the negro race by frequent emigration of civilized negroes back to the interior of Africa; and even now that race might reap the benefit of its enslaved members, if the latter or the best instructed among them were sent back to the interior of Africa."

However, this quote is taken from an article whose opening sentence is: "It is evident that Moses was opposed to slavery." The article itself, titled "On the Provisional Portion of the Mosaic Code, with Special Reference to Polygamy and Slavery", defends the Mosaic form of slavery as found in the Hebrew Bible, while at the same time offering certain criticisms.

Personal life
Wise was married twice. His first wife was Therese Bloch, sister of Edward H. Bloch, the founder of Bloch Publishing Company. They had 10 children eight of whom were living at the time of his death: Emily Wise May; Leo Wise; Dr. Julius Wise; Ida Wise Bernheim; Isidor Wise; Helen Wise Molony; Iphigene Miriam Wise Ochs, married to Adolph Ochs; and Harry Wise. She died in 1874. In 1876, he married Selma Bondi; they had four children: Elsie Corrine Wise; Rabbi Jonah Bondi Wise; Regina Wise May; and Isaac M. Wise.

Wise had no close relation to Rabbi Stephen Samuel Wise.

His works
Wise was the author of the following works:

 The History of the Israelitish Nation from Abraham to the Present Time, Albany, 1854
 History of the first commonwealth of the Israelite, Cincinnati, 1860
 The Essence of Judaism, Cincinnati, 1861
 The Origin of Christianity, and a Commentary on the Acts of the Apostles, 1868
 Judaism, Its Doctrines and Duties, 1872
 The Martyrdom of Jesus of Nazareth: a Historico-Critical Treatise on the Last Chapter of the Gospel, 1874
 The Cosmic God, 1876
 History of the Hebrews' Second Commonwealth, 1880
 Judaism and Christianity, Their Agreements and Disagreements, 1883
 A Defense of Judaism vs. Proselytizing Christianity, 1889
 Pronaos to Holy Writ, 1891

In his early years he wrote a number of novels, which appeared first as serials in The Israelite, and later in book form; these were:

 The Convert, 1854
 The Catastrophe of Eger
 The Shoemaker's Family
 Resignation and Fidelity, or Life and Romance
 Romance, Philosophy, and Cabalah, or the Conflagration in Frankfort-on-the-Main, 1855
 The Last Struggle of the Nation, 1856
 The Combat of the People, or Hillel and Herod, 1858
 The First of the Maccabees

He wrote also a number of German novels, which appeared as serials in the Deborah; among these may be mentioned:

 Die Juden von Landshuth
 Der Rothkopf, oder des Schulmeisters Tochter
 Baruch und Sein Ideal

In addition to all these works Wise published in the editorial columns of The Israelite numerous studies on various subjects of Jewish interest. He even wrote a couple of plays, "Der Maskirte Liebhaber" and "Das Glück Reich zu Sein".

During his lifetime Wise was regarded as the most prominent Reform Jew of his time in the United States. His genius for organization was of a very high order; and he was masterful, rich in resources, and possessed of an inflexible will. More than of any of his contemporaries, it may be said of him that he left the imprint of his personality upon the development of Reform Judaism in the United States.

Links to some works of Wise

Legacy and honors
The World War II Liberty Ship  was named in his honor.
A park in North College Hill, Ohio was dedicated to Wise. In 2022, the park was renovated and re-dedicated.

References

Further reading

External links

 Isaac Mayer Wise Digital Archive at the American Jewish Archives
 Works by Isaac Mayer Wise in the German Union Catalogue
 Funeral of Rabbi Wise
 
 Die Deborah (B63) is a digitized periodical at the Leo Baeck Institute

1819 births
1900 deaths
19th-century Austrian people
American Reform rabbis
American Jewish theologians
Judaic scholars
Rabbis from Cincinnati
Jewish American writers
Presidents of Hebrew Union College – Jewish Institute of Religion
American people of Bohemian descent
American people of Czech-Jewish descent
People from Cheb District
Religious leaders from Albany, New York
Austrian Empire emigrants to the United States
19th-century American rabbis